FRIGS are a Canadian indie rock band from Toronto, Ontario, whose 2018 album Basic Behaviour was longlisted for the 2018 Polaris Music Prize. The band members are vocalist Bria Salmena, guitarist Duncan Hay Jennings, bassist Lucas Savatti and drummer Kris Bowering.

History
The band performed live shows in the Toronto area, and produced and released a self-titled EP under the name Dirty Frigs in 2014 before signing to Arts & Crafts, which released their second EP, Slush, in 2016.

Basic Behaviour, the band's first full-length album, was released in 2018, with cover art by Olenka Szymonski. To support the album, the band set out on a 37-day tour.

Since 2019, Bowering, Hay Jennings, and Salmena, along with Toronto bassist Kyle Connolly, have been members of Orville Peck's touring band. Savetti played on Peck's Pony album, along with Bowering and Hay Jennings.

Salmena has also released two EPs of country music covers as a solo artist,  Covers Vol. 1 (2021) and  Covers Vol. 2 (2023).

References

Canadian indie rock groups
Musical groups from Toronto
Arts & Crafts Productions artists